Robert Wesley Ammerman (1841 – September 30, 1907) was an American soldier who received the Medal of Honor for valor during the American Civil War.

Biography
Ammerman joined the 148th Pennsylvania Infantry from Milesburg, Pennsylvania in August 1862. While performing his MOH action, he suffered the loss of his right leg, and was discharged due to his wounds in May 1865. He died on September 30, 1907 and was laid to rest in the Lost Creek Presbyterian Cemetery in McAlisterville, Pennsylvania.

Medal of Honor citation
Citation:

The President of the United States of America, in the name of Congress, takes pleasure in presenting the Medal of Honor to Private Robert Wesley Ammerman, United States Army, for extraordinary heroism on 12 May 1864, while serving with Company B, 148th Pennsylvania Infantry, in action at Spotsylvania, Virginia, for capture of battle flag of 8th North Carolina (Confederate States of America), being one of the foremost in the assault.

See also

 List of American Civil War Medal of Honor recipients: A–F

References

External links
 
 Congressional Medal of Honor Society

1841 births
1907 deaths
Union Army soldiers
United States Army Medal of Honor recipients
People of Pennsylvania in the American Civil War
American Civil War recipients of the Medal of Honor